The BhlA Holin Family (TC# 1.E.27) is named after putative holin-like peptides encoded in bacteria with bacteriocin similarities. BhlA proteins are generally about 67 to 80 amino acyl residues (aas) in length and exhibit a single N-terminal transmembrane segment (TMS). BhlA (TC# 1.E.27.1.4). It has an antibacterial activity against Gram-positive bacteria. A representative list of proteins belonging to this family can be found in the Transporter Classification Database.

See also 
 Holin
 Lysin
 Transporter Classification Database

Further reading 
 "BPUM_2741 - Uncharacterized protein - Bacillus pumilus (strain SAFR-032) - BPUM_2741 gene & protein". www.uniprot.org. Retrieved 2016-03-30.

References 

Holins